The 2014 Cup of China was the third event of six in the 2014–15 ISU Grand Prix of Figure Skating, a senior-level international invitational competition series. It was held at the Shanghai Oriental Sports Center in Shanghai on November 7–9. Medals were awarded in the disciplines of men's singles, ladies' singles, pair skating, and ice dancing. Skaters earned points toward qualifying for the 2014–15 Grand Prix Final.

Entries

Changes to preliminary roster
 On September 2, Zhao Yue / Zheng Xun were announced as host picks.
 On September 2, Peter Liebers was removed from the roster due to an injury. On September 9, Alexei Bychenko was added as his replacement.
 On September 2, Zhao Yue / Zheng Xun were added as a host pick.
 On September 9, Kim Hae-jin was added to the roster, in place of a host pick.
 On September 29, Julia Antipova / Nodari Maisuradze were removed from the roster, due to Antipova being hospitalized due to Anorexia. On October 9, Jessica Calalang / Zack Sidhu were announced as their replacements.
 On September 22, it was reported that Tatiana Volosozhar / Maxim Trankov were going to be withdrawing due to an injury to Trankov. On October 1, they were removed from the roster. On October 13, their replacements were announced as Arina Cherniavskaia / Antonio Souza-Kordeyru.
 On October 16, Zhan Bush and was removed from the roster due to health problems. On October 21, Kim Jin-seo was announced as his replacement.
 On October 17, Tarah Kayne / Daniel O'Shea was removed from the roster due to lack of training time. On October 22, Natasha Purich / Andrew Wolfe were announced as their replacements.
 On October 24, Joshua Farris was removed from the roster due to his high ankle sprain not yet being recovered. He was not replaced.
 On October 30, Song Nan was removed from the roster. No reason has been given. He was replaced by Guan Yuhang.
 On November 3, Zhang Kexin was removed from the roster. No reason has been given. She was not replaced.

Results

Men
Prior to the free skating, Yan Han and Yuzuru Hanyu collided on the ice during warm-up. Both had visible injuries and were bleeding, yet still chose to compete. Hanyu later received stitches for his injuries. He also skipped the medal ceremony afterwards.

Ladies

Pairs

Ice dancing

References

External links
 2014 Cup of China at the International Skating Union
 Starting orders and result details

Cup of China
Cup of China
Cup of China
Cup of China
Sports competitions in Shanghai